Seventh Star is the twelfth studio album by English heavy metal band Black Sabbath. Released in January 1986, it features founding guitarist Tony Iommi alongside musicians Geoff Nicholls, Eric Singer, and Dave Spitz, playing keyboards, drums, and bass, respectively, and Glenn Hughes, ex-Deep Purple and ex-Trapeze vocalist, as lead singer. The album was the group's first release without bassist and primary lyricist Geezer Butler, who left the band in 1984 after the Born Again tour. It was originally written, recorded, and intended to be the first solo album by Iommi. Because of the pressures from Warner Bros. Records and the prompting of band manager Don Arden, the record was billed as Black Sabbath featuring Tony Iommi. Later releases label the album as simply by Black Sabbath. Despite the issues behind the release's production, it earned moderate commercial success, reaching #27 in the UK and #78 on the Billboard 200 chart.

Album information
As was the case with its predecessor, Born Again, this album was not intended to be a Black Sabbath record. Last-minute pressure from Warner Bros. stemmed from the belief that it was likely to sell more with the famous name. Its sound is a drastic (and intentional) departure from the trademark Sabbath sound. Many of the songs have a very hard rock sound, while some contain a bluesy feel (especially "Heart Like a Wheel"). Seventh Star was the first album to feature long-time keyboardist Geoff Nicholls as an official band member.

"It seemed to me like the band was on its last legs and my heart just went out to Tony," recalled former drummer Bill Ward. "I thought, 'God, how much more can he take?' or 'How much more does he want?'… What I saw was a great band I just felt was diminishing."

The promo-single and video version of "No Stranger to Love" had additional harmony vocals added by Hughes to make it more "radio-friendly". Actress Denise Crosby, who would later portray Tasha Yar in Star Trek: The Next Generation, was featured in the video.

A tour for the album featured Hughes only at the first few shows. He was fired five dates into the tour, and replaced by Ray Gillen, who completed the North American and European legs of the tour, though several dates in the US were cancelled. W.A.S.P. and Anthrax were opening acts on the North American tour.

Hughes has performed "No Stranger to Love", "Seventh Star" and "Heart Like a Wheel" at some of his live concerts. "I really like Seventh Star," Tony Martin told Sabbath fanzine Southern Cross, "mainly because I admire Glenn Hughes' voice."

Seventh Star was rereleased in Europe on 1 November 2010, as a two-disc special edition. Disc 2 includes a concert recorded in 1986, with Gillen on vocals. The single version of No Stranger to Love is a bonus track on disc 1.

Reviews and reception

The album peaked at #78 on the Billboard 200 chart. Some retrospective critical assessments of the album have been negative; for example, The New Rolling Stone Album Guide rated the release only two out of five stars.

However, critic Eduardo Rivadavia of AllMusic gave Seventh Star a mixed to positive review, praising what he saw as the "fiery tunefulness" that makes "aggressive hard rockers like "In for the Kill," "Turn to Stone," and "Danger Zone" uncommonly catchy". However, he argued that the songwriting and vocal work fell flat on songs such as the album's title track. He stated generally that he found the release an "often misunderstood and underrated album".

Reviews from the period were more positive. A reviewer for the magazine Kerrang! gave Seventh Star a perfect score of five out of five.

Track listing

Standard Edition
Music by Tony Iommi; lyrics by Tony Iommi, Glenn Hughes, Geoff Nicholls and Jeff Glixman.

2010 Deluxe Edition Disc 2
Recorded at Hammersmith Odeon in London, England on 2 June 1986, featuring Ray Gillen performing vocals

A contemporary South Korean release sported a much reduced and reordered track listing.

Personnel
Black Sabbath
 Tony Iommi – guitar
 Glenn Hughes – vocals
 Dave Spitz – bass guitar (except on "No Stranger to Love")
 Eric Singer – drums
 Geoff Nicholls – keyboards

Additional Musicians
 Gordon Copley – bass guitar (on "No Stranger to Love")
 Ray Gillen – vocals (on 2010 Deluxe Edition Disc 2)

Release history

Charts

References

External links
 
Seventh Star entry at black-sabbath.com
20th Anniversary article about the album

1986 albums
Albums produced by Jeff Glixman
Black Sabbath albums
Glenn Hughes albums
Vertigo Records albums
Warner Records albums